Events from the year 1931 in Scotland.

Incumbents 

 Secretary of State for Scotland and Keeper of the Great Seal – William Adamson until 24 August; then Sir Archibald Sinclair, Bt

Law officers 
 Lord Advocate – Craigie Mason Aitchison
 Solicitor General for Scotland – John Charles Watson until November; then Wilfrid Normand

Judiciary 
 Lord President of the Court of Session and Lord Justice General – Lord Clyde
 Lord Justice Clerk – Lord Alness
 Chairman of the Scottish Land Court – Lord St Vigeans

Events 
 13 February – Scottish Youth Hostels Association established.
 1 May – National Trust for Scotland established and acquires its first property, Crookston Castle (donated by Sir John Stirling-Maxwell, 10th Baronet).
 5 September – Celtic goalkeeper John Thomson dies in hospital after fracturing his skull in a collision with Rangers forward Sam English in the 'Old Firm' League derby at Ibrox Park.
 15–16 September – Invergordon Mutiny: Sailors in the Royal Navy take strike action over pay cuts.
 27 October – 1931 United Kingdom general election: The Unionist Party wins a majority of Scottish seats as the National Government retains power with a landslide victory throughout the UK.
 12 December – work on construction of "Hull 534", the Cunard liner , at John Brown & Company's shipyard at Clydebank is suspended due to the Great Depression.
 31 December – Ayr Corporation Tramways cease operation, being replaced by bus services operated by Scottish Motor Traction.
 Lord Dumfries purchases the recently deserted islands of St Kilda from Sir Reginald MacLeod of Dunvegan to preserve them as a bird sanctuary; he will bequeath them to the National Trust of Scotland on his death in 1956.

Births 

 2 January – James D. Murray, mathematician and academic
 12 January – Bert Ormond, Scottish-born New Zealand footballer (died 2017)
 26 February – Ally McLeod, football manager (died 2004)
 13 March
 James Martin, actor
 Helen Renton, Director of the Women's Royal Air Force (died 2016)
 18 March – John Fraser, actor
 29 March – James Weatherhead, Church of Scotland minister (died 2017)
 27 April – Alex Campbell, folk singer (died 1987)
 29 April – Lonnie Donegan, skiffle musician (died 2002 in England)
 30 April - William Watson, author, playwright and newspaper editor (died 2005)
 3 May – Thomas Sutherland, academic and Islamic Jihad hostage (died 2016 in the United States)
 6 May – Sandy Grant Gordon, whisky distiller (died 2020)
 9 May
 Jimmy Gauld, footballer involved in match fixing (died 2004 in London)
 Alistair MacFarlane, engineer and academic
 11 June – Kenneth Cameron, Baron Cameron of Lochbroom, lawyer and judge
 16 June – John Grant, footballer (died 2021)
 1 August - Pat Heywood, actress
 2 August – Karl Miller, literary editor (died 2014 in England)
 11 September – Bill Simpson, television actor (died 1993)
 22 September – George Younger, Conservative politician, Secretary of State for Scotland (died 2003)
 24 September – Elizabeth Blackadder, painter (died 2021)
 September - Arthur Thompson, gangster (died 1986)
 9 December – Ian McIntyre, journalist and BBC Radio executive (died 2014)
 16 December - Karl Denver, singer (died 1998 in Manchester)
 29 December – Bobby Shearer, footballer (died 2006)
 Eric Auld, painter (died 2013)

Deaths 
 17 March – James Stewart, Labour Party politician, MP for Glasgow St. Rollox 1922–1931 (born 1863)
 27 May – Norah Neilson Gray, portrait painter (born 1882)
 5 August – Archibald Barr, mechanical engineer (born 1855)
 3 December - Frederick Walters, architect, notable for his Roman Catholic churches (born 1849 in London) 
 7 December – Leslie Hunter, painter (born 1877)
 David Hay Fleming, historian and antiquary (born 1849)
 Ronald Campbell Macfie, medical doctor, poet and science writer (born 1867)
 Andrew Seth Pringle-Pattison, philosopher (born 1856)

The arts
 Jenny Brown's documentary film A Crofter's Life in Scotland is made.
 A. J. Cronin's first novel Hatter's Castle is published.
 Bruce Marshall's novel Father Malachy's Miracle is published.
 Dorothy L. Sayers' detective story The Five Red Herrings, set amongst the Galloway artistic community, is published.
 Approximate date – Ronnie L. Scott makes the first Scottish colour film, Where the Bens Stand Sentinel, and first Scottish sound film, Sunny Days.

See also 
 Timeline of Scottish history
 1931 in Northern Ireland

References 

 
Years of the 20th century in Scotland
Scotland
1930s in Scotland